Natale a Londra – Dio salvi la regina is a 2016 Italian comedy film directed by Volfango De Biasi.

Cast

See also
 List of Christmas films

References

External links

2016 films
Films directed by Volfango De Biasi
2010s Italian-language films
2016 comedy films
2010s Christmas comedy films
Italian Christmas comedy films
2010s Italian films